The 1460s decade ran from January 1, 1460, to December 31, 1469.

Significant people
 Charles I (the Bold) (1433–1477), Duke of Burgundy, r. 1467–1477
 Jean Fouquet of France (1420–1481), painter
 Francis II (1433–1488), Duke of Brittany, r. 1458–1488
 Gendun Drup of Tibet (1391–1474), First Dalai Lama
 Diogo Gomes of Portugal (1420–1485), navigator, explorer and writer
 Johannes Gutenberg of Mainz (1395?–1468), printer and inventor of the movable type printing press
 Henry the Navigator of Portugal (1394–1460), Portuguese prince and patron of exploration
 William Herbert of Wales (1423–1469), Pro-York nobleman
 Sir Thomas Malory of England (1405?–1471), soldier, member of Parliament, political prisoner, and author of Le Morte d'Arthur
 Richard Neville of England (1428–1471), nobleman, administrator, and military commander
 Demetrios Palaiologos of Morea (1407–1470), Byzantine Prince and Despot of Morea
 Thomas Palaiologos of Morea (1409–1465), Byzantine Prince and Despot of Morea
 Philip III (the Good) (1396–1467), Duke of Burgundy, r. 1419–1467
 Richard Plantagenet, Duke of Gloucester (1452–1483), English Prince, Yorkist commander, and future King of England
 Richard Plantagenet, 3rd Duke of York of England (1411-1460), nobleman, military commander, and Yorkist claimant to the Throne of England
 Mar Shimun IV, Patriarch of the Assyrian Church of the East (Patriarchate then based in Mosul), held position 1437–1497
 Tlacaelel (1397-1487), Tlacochcalcatl of the Aztec Empire
 Jasper Tudor of Wales (c.1431–1495), nobleman and adventurer
 Owen Tudor of Wales (c.1400–1461), soldier and courtier at the court of the English Kings
 Andrea del Verrocchio of Florence (1435–1488), painter, sculptor, and goldsmith

References